Takyeh is a historical monument of the 13th century. It is a part of Old City and located on Gazi Muhammed street, in the city of Baku, in Azerbaijan. The building was also registered as a national architectural monument by the decision of the Cabinet of Ministers of the Republic of Azerbaijan dated August 2, 2001, No. 132.

History
The monument was built in XIII century. It mainly operated as mahallah mosque, and also as secondary school. In 1967, archeological excavations were conducted around the takyeh. It was restored in 1970s.

Dervishes were spiritually purified, performing individual and mass religious rituals here. Takiyyas were also a shelter for traveling strangers.

Architectural features
The monument is square-shaped and consists of a single room. Its facade is towards the Maiden Tower. Unusual plan of the takyeh, as well as covering of the worshipping room with stepped domes system resulted with specificity of the interior of the monument.

Gallery

See also
Gileyli Mosque
Jinn Mosque
Chin Mosque
Sheikh Ibrahim Mosque 
Sayyid Yahya Murtuza Mosque
Haji Heybat Mosque

References

Takyehs
Architecture in Azerbaijan
Monuments and memorials in Azerbaijan
Buildings and structures in Baku
Tourist attractions in Baku
Icherisheher